Sar Firuzabad castle is a historical castle located in Eslamabad-e Gharb County in Kermanshah Province, The longevity of this fortress dates back to the Sasanian Empire.

References 

Sasanian castles
Castles in Iran